"I Need You" is a song written and performed by Jars of Clay. It was the first single from their 2002 studio album, The Eleventh Hour. The band stated that they took the same songwriting approach for this song as they did with "Love Song For A Savior" from their self-titled debut album. However, the music for "I Need You" was actually written during the If I Left the Zoo sessions. A live version of the song appears on the band's 2003 double album, Furthermore: From the Studio, From the Stage. This song also appears on the WOW Hits 2003 compilation album.

Track listing
"I Need You" (Album Version) - 3:38 (Charlie Lowell, Dan Haseltine, Matt Odmark, & Stephen Mason)

Charts
 No. 1 Christian CHR
 No. 8 Christian Rock

2002 singles
Jars of Clay songs
Songs written by Dan Haseltine
Songs written by Charlie Lowell
Songs written by Stephen Mason (musician)
Songs written by Matt Odmark
2002 songs
Essential Records (Christian) singles